The 2023 Dartmouth Big Green football team will represent Dartmouth College in the 2023 NCAA Division I FCS football season as a member of the Ivy League. The team will be led by 23rd-year head coach Buddy Teevens and play their home games at Memorial Field.

Previous season

The Big Green finished the 2022 season with an overall record of 3–7 and a mark of 2–5 in conference play to finish in a tie for sixth in the Ivy League.

Schedule

References

Dartmouth
Dartmouth Big Green football seasons
Dartmouth Big Green football